Total Freedom is the fifth studio album by Canadian singer-songwriter Kathleen Edwards. It was released by Dualtone Records on August 14, 2020.

Background and recording
In 2014, two years after the success of her album Voyageur, Edwards decided to quit music and open a coffee shop in Stittsville called Quitters. Edwards returned to music in 2017 after Maren Morris invited her to write a song for her album, Girl. As a result, Edwards began writing and recording songs for her own album. The album was recorded at studios in Stittsville, Nashville, and Kingston. The album was produced by Edwards alongside co-producers Jim Bryson and Ian Fitchuk.

Critical reception

Total Freedom received positive reviews from music critics, who lauded the album as a fitting return for Edwards. At Metacritic, which assigns a normalized rating out of 100 to reviews from mainstream publications, the album received an average score of 80, based on eight reviews, indicating "generally favorable reviews" from reviews.

Steve Horowitz of PopMatters praised the album, writing "the songs are lyrically delightful and melodically charming ... Edwards' delightfully delivers her insights, even the unpleasant ones." Writing for AllMusic, Mark Deming opined, "However long she decides to keep writing and singing her songs, we can only be grateful for the tough, heartfelt beauty she's chosen to share."

In a more critical review of the album, Hal Horowitz of American Songwriter wrote that "her singing remains strong and she is emoting about issues close to her, these tracks would benefit from more musical muscle." However, Horowitz later noted "even if Total Freedom isn’t her finest work, it’s encouraging that Edwards has returned to releasing new material and doing what she does best."

Track listing

Personnel
 Kathleen Edwards – vocals, acoustic and electric guitars
 Peter Von Althen – drums, percussion
 Darcy Yates – bass guitar
 Gord Tough – electric  and slide guitar
 Jim Bryson – acoustic, electric, and slide guitars, organ, piano, banjo, percussion, string machine, effects, synthesizer, backing vocals

Additional musicians
 Blair Hogan – electric guitar (track 1)
 Jill Andrews – backing vocals (tracks 1 and 6)
 Aaron Goldstein – pedal steel (tracks 2, 4 and 6)
 Todd Lombardo – nylon string guitar (track 3), acoustic guitar (tracks 5, 8 and 10), banjo (track 8)
 Ian Fitchuk – bass guitar (tracks 3 and 5), book kick/percussion (track 3), Wurlitzer (track 4), and piano (tracks 8 and 10)
 Daniel Tashian – backing vocal and guitar (track 5)
 Kinley Dowling – violin, viola and string arrangement (track 6)
 Phillipe Charbonneau – bass guitar (track 7)
 Jon Hynes – bass guitar (tracks 8 and 10)
 Courtney Marie Andrews – backing vocals (track 8)

Technical personnel
 Jim Bryson and Kathleen Edwards – producers (tracks 1, 2, 4, 6, 7 and 9)
 Ian Fitchuk and Kathleen Edwards – producers (tracks 2, 5, 8 and 10)
 Jim Bryson, Ian Fitchuk and Kathleen Edwards – producers (track 3)
 Craig Alvin, Zack Pancoast, Zane Whitfield, Jim Bryson, Dylan Lodge and Konrad Snyder – engineers
 Konrad Snyder – mixing
 Greg Calbi – mastering

Charts

References

External links
 

2020 albums
Kathleen Edwards albums
Dualtone Records albums